

Squad

Competitions

Serie B

Results

Table

Coppa Italia

Squad statistics

Appearances and goals

|-
|colspan="14"|Players who appeared for Parma that left during the season:
|}

Top scorers

Disciplinary record

Sources
  RSSSF - Italy 2008/09

Parma Calcio 1913 seasons
Parma